Neuenschwander is a Swiss surname that may refer to

Bob Neuenschwander (born 1948), American businessman and politician
Caryl Neuenschwander (born 1984), Swiss ice hockey player
Juerg Neuenschwander (born 1953), Swiss documentary film director and producer 
Jürg Neuenschwander (1947–2014), Swiss organist and musician
Katrin Neuenschwander (born 1971), Swiss alpine skier 
Maja Neuenschwander (born 1980), Swiss long-distance runner 
Marie Brennan, pen name of the American fantasy author Bryn Neuenschwander
Philipp Neuenschwander (born 1964), Swiss ice hockey forward
Rivane Neuenschwander (born 1967), Brazilian artist
Rosa Neuenschwander (1883–1962), Swiss feminist

German-language surnames